This article provides a list of the districts of the Amhara Region of Ethiopia.

List of districts by zone

Defunct woredas

 Achefer
 Angolalla Terana Asagirt
 Artuma Fursina Jile
 Banja
 Belessa
 Bure Wemberma
 Chefe Golana Dewerahmedo
 Dawuntna Delant
 Gera Midirna Keya Gebriel
 Mam Midrina Lalo Midir
 Sanja
 Simada
 Estie
 Tachi Gayinit
 Lay Gayint
 Sedie
 Muja
 Farta

References

Amhara
Amhara Region